Charlie Birmingham (24 August 1922 – 1 January 1993) was an English footballer, who played as an inside forward in the Football League for Tranmere Rovers.

References

External links

Tranmere Rovers F.C. players
Everton F.C. players
Winsford United F.C. players
English Football League players
Association football inside forwards
1922 births
1993 deaths
Footballers from Liverpool
English footballers